In the Hindu tradition, a murti is a devotional image such as a statue, or "idol" (a common and non-pejorative term in Indian English), of a deity or saint. In Hindu temples, it is a symbolic icon. Thus, not all Hindu images of gods and saints are murti, for example, purely decorative sculptures in temples and on the streets. A murti is itself not a god in Hinduism, but it is a shape, embodiment, or manifestation of a deity. 

Murti are also found in some nontheistic Jain traditions, where they serve as symbols of revered mortals inside Jain temples, and are worshiped in murtipujaka rituals.

A murti is typically made by carving stone, wood working, metal casting or through pottery. Ancient era texts describing their proper proportions, positions and gestures include the Puranas, Agamas, and Samhitas. The expressions in a murti vary in diverse Hindu traditions, ranging from ugra symbolism to express destruction, fear and violence (Durga, Kali) to saumya symbolism to express joy, knowledge and harmony (Saraswati, Lakshmi and Ganpati). Saumya images are most common in Hindu temples. Other murti forms found in Hinduism include the lingam.

A murti is an embodiment of the divine, the ultimate reality or Brahman, to some Hindus. In a religious context, they are found in Hindu temples or homes, where they may be treated as a beloved guest and serve as a participant of puja. On other occasions, they serve as the centre of attention in annual festive processions; these are called utsava murti. The earliest murti are mentioned by Pāṇini in the 4th century BCE. Prior to that, the agnicayana ritual ground seemed to serve as a template for the temple.

A murti (also spelt murthi) may also referred to as a vigraha, pratima or simply deity.

Hindu devotees go to the mandirs to take darshan, offer naivedya to deity, do puja and aarti.

Etymology and nomenclature

Murti literally means any solid body or form with definite shape or limits produced from material elements. It contrasts with mind, thought and the immaterial in ancient Indian literature. The term also refers to any embodiment, manifestation, incarnation, personification, appearance, image, idol or statue of a deity.

The earliest mention of the term murti occurs in primary Upanishads composed in the 1st millennium BCE, particularly in verse 3.2 of Aitareya Upanishad, verse 1.13 of Shvetashvatara Upanishad, verse 6.14 of Maitrayaniya Upanishad and verse 1.5 of Prashna Upanishad. For example, the Maitrayaniya Upanishad uses the term to mean a "form, manifestation of time". The section sets out to prove Time exists, acknowledges the difficulty in proving Time exists by Pramana (epistemology in Indian philosophy), then inserts a theory of inductive inference for epistemological proof as follows,

The section includes the concept of Time and non-Time, stating that non-Time as that which existed before creation of universe, and time as which came into existence with the creation of universe. Non-time is indivisible, time is divisible, and the Maitri Upanishad then asserts that the "year is the mūrti of time". Robert Hume translates the discussion of "mūrti of time", in verse 6.14 of the Maitri Upanishad, as "form".

Most scholars, such as Jan Gonda, Max Muller, PV Kane and Stephanie Jamison, state that there were neither murti nor temples nor idol-facilitated worship in the Vedic era. The Vedic Hinduism rituals were directed at nature and abstract deities called during yajna with hymns. However, there isn't universal consensus, with scholars such as AC Das, pointing to the word Mūradeva in Rig Veda verses 7.104.24, 10.87.2 and 10.87.14. This word may refer to "Deva who is fixed" or "Deva who is foolish". The former interpretation, if accurate, may imply that there were communities in the Vedic era who had Deva in the form of murti, and the context of these hymns suggest that the term could possibly be referring to practices of the tribal communities outside of the Vedic fold.

One of the earliest firm textual evidence of Deva images, in the sense of murti, is found in Jivikarthe Capanye by the Sanskrit grammarian Pāṇini who lived about 4th century BCE. He mentions Acala and Cala, with former referring to images in a shrine, and the latter meaning images that were carried from place to place. Panini also mentions Devalaka, meaning custodians of images of worship who show the images but do not sell them, as well as Jivika as people whose source of livelihood was the gifts they received from devotees. In ancient Sanskrit texts that follow Panini's work, numerous references are found to divine images with terms such as Devagrha, Devagara, Devakula, Devayatana and others. These texts, states Noel Salmond, strongly suggest that temples and murti were in existence in ancient India by about 4th century BCE. Recent archaeological evidence confirms that the knowledge and art of sculpture was established in India by the Maurya Empire period (~3rd century BCE).

By early 1st millennium BCE, the term murti meant idols, image or statue in various Indian texts such as Bhavishya Purana verse 132.5.7, Brihat Samhita 1.8.29 and inscriptions in different parts of India. The term murti has been a more generic term referring to an idol or statue of anyone, either a deity, of any human being, animal or any art. Pratima includes murti as well as painting of any non-anthropomorphic object. In contrast, Bera or Bimba meant "idol of god" only, and Vigraha was synonymous with Bimba.

Types

A murti in contemporary usage is any image or statue. It may be found inside or outside a temple or home, installed to be moved with a festive procession (utsava murti), or just be a landmark. It is a significant part of Hindu iconography, and is implemented in many ways. Two major categories include:
Raudra or Ugra - are images that were meant to terrify, induce fear. These typically have wide, circular eyes, carry weapons, have skulls and bones as adornment. These idols were worshipped by soldiers before going to war, or by people in times of distress or errors. Raudra deity temples were not set up inside villages or towns, but invariably outside and in remote areas of a kingdom.
Shanta and Saumya - are images that were pacific, peaceful and expressive of love, compassion, kindness and other virtues in Hindu pantheon. These images would carry symbolic icons of peace, knowledge, music, wealth, flowers, sensuality among other things. In ancient India, these temples were predominant inside villages and towns.

Beyond anthropomorphic forms of religious murti, some traditions of Hinduism cherish aniconism, where alternate symbols are shaped into a murti, such as the linga for Shiva, yoni for Devi, and the saligrama for Vishnu.

Methods and manuals

Murti, when produced properly, are made according to the design rules of the Shilpa Shastras. They recommend materials, measurements, proportion, decoration and symbolism of the murti. Explanation of the metaphysical significance of each stage of manufacture and the prescription of specific mantras to sanctify the process and evoke and invoke the power of the deity in the image are found in the liturgical handbooks the Agamas and Tantras. In Tantric traditions, a murti is installed by priests through the Prana pratishta ceremony, where mantras are recited sometimes with yantras (mystic diagrams), whereby state Harold Coward and David Goa, the "divine vital energy of the cosmos is infused into the sculpture" and then the divine is welcomed as one would welcome a friend. According to Gudrun Buhnemann, the esoteric Hindu tantric traditions through texts such as Tantra-tattva follow elaborate rituals to infuse life into a murti. Some tantra texts such as the Pancaratraraksa state that anyone who considers an icon of Vishnu as nothing but "an ordinary object" made of iron "goes to hell". The use of murti and particularly the prana pratistha consecration ceremony, states Buhnemann, has been criticised by Hindu groups. These groups state that this practice came from more recent "false tantra books", and there is not a single word in the Vedas about such a ceremony.

The artists who make any art or craft, including murti, were known as shilpins. The formally trained Shilpins shape the murti not in accordance with fancy but in accordance with canonical manuals such as the Agamas and the Shilpa Shastras texts such as Vishvakarma. The material of construction range from clay to wood to marble to metal alloys such as panchaloha. The sixth century Brihat Samhita and eighth century text Manasara-Silpasastra (literally: "treatise on art using method of measurement"), identify nine materials for murti construction – gold, silver, copper, stone, wood, sudha (a type of stucco, mortar plaster), sarkara (gravel, grit), abhasa (marble types), and earth (clay, terracotta). For abhasa, the texts describe working methods for various types of marble, specialised stones, colours, and a range of opacity (transparent, translucent and crystal).

Brihat Samhita, a 6th-century encyclopaedia of a range of topics from horticulture to astrology to gemology to murti and temple design, specifies in Chapter 56 that the pratima (murti) height should be  of the sanctum sanctorum's door height, the Pratima height and the sanctum sanctorum room's width be in the ratio of 0.292, it stand on a pedestal that is 0.146 of sanctum room width, thereafter the text describes 20 types of temples with their dimensions. Chapter 58 of the text describes the ratios of various anatomical parts of a murti, from head to toe, along with the recommendation in verse 59.29 that generally accepted variations in dress, decoration and dimensions of local regional traditions for the murti is the artistic tradition.

The texts recommend materials of construction, proportions, postures and mudra, symbolic items the murti holds in its hands, colours, garments and ornaments to go with the murti of each god or goddess, vehicles of deities such as Garuda, bull and lion, and other details. The texts also include chapters on the design of Jaina and Buddhist murti, as well as reliefs of sages, apsaras, different types of devotees (based on bhakti yoga, jnana yoga, karma yoga, ascetics) to decorate the area near the murti. The texts recommend that the material of construction and relative scale of murti be correlated to the scale of the temple dimensions, using twelve types of comparative measurements.

In Southern India, the material used predominantly for murti is black granite, while material in North India is white marble. However, for some Hindus, it is not the materials used that matter, but the faith and meditation on the universal Absolute Brahman. More particularly, devotees meditate or worship on the formless God (nirguna Brahman) through murti symbolism of God (saguna Brahman) during a puja before a murti, or the meditation on a Tirthankara in the case of Jainism, thus making the material of construction or the specific shape of the murti not spiritually important.

According to John Keay, "Only after achieving remarkable expertise in the portrayal of the Buddha figure and of animal and human, did Indian stonemasons turn to producing images of the orthodox 'Hindu' deities". This view is, however, not shared by other scholars. Trudy King et al. state that stone images of reverential figures and guardian spirits (yaksha) were first produced in Jainism and Hinduism, by about 2 century BCE, as suggested by Mathura region excavations, and this knowledge grew into iconographic traditions and stone monuments in India including those for Buddhism.

Role in worship 

Major Hindu traditions such as Vaishnavism, Shaivism, Shaktism and Smartaism favour the use of murti. These traditions suggest that it is easier to dedicate time and focus on spirituality through anthropomorphic or non-anthropomorphic icons. Hindu scriptures such as the Bhagavad Gita, states in verse 12.5,

In Hinduism, states Jeaneane Fowler, a murti itself is not god, it is an "image of god" and thus a symbol and representation. A murti is a form and manifestation, states Fowler, of the formless Absolute. Thus a literal translation of murti as 'idol' is incorrect, when idol is understood as superstitious end in itself. Just like the photograph of a person is not the real person, a murti is an image in Hinduism but not the real thing, but in both cases the image reminds of something of emotional and real value to the viewer. When a person worships a murti, it is assumed to be a manifestation of the essence or spirit of the deity, the worshipper's spiritual ideas and needs are meditated through it, yet the idea of ultimate reality or Brahman is not confined in it.

Devotional (bhakti movement) practices centred on cultivating a deep and personal bond of love with God, often expressed and facilitated with one or more murti, and includes individual or community hymns, japa or singing (bhajan, kirtan or aarti). Acts of devotion, in major temples particularly, are structured on treating the murti as the manifestation of a revered guest, and the daily routine can include awakening the murti in the morning and making sure that it "is washed, dressed, and garlanded." In Vaishnavism, the building of a temple for the murti is considered an act of devotion, but non-murti symbolism is also common wherein the aromatic Tulsi plant or Saligrama is an aniconic reminder of the spiritualism in Vishnu. These puja rituals with the murti correspond to ancient cultural practices for a beloved guest, and the murti is welcomed, taken care of, and then requested to retire.

Christopher John Fuller states that an image in Hinduism cannot be equated with a deity and the object of worship is the divine whose power is inside the image, and the image is not the object of worship itself, Hindus believe everything is worthy of worship as it contains divine energy emanating from the one god. According to the Agamas, the bimba murti ( / ) is different from the mantra murti from the perspective of rituals, gestures, hymns and offerings.

Some Hindu denominations like Arya Samaj and Satya Mahima Dharma reject idol worship.

Role in history

Murti and temples were well established in South Asia, before the start of Delhi Sultanate in the late 12th century CE. They became a target of destruction during raids and religious wars between Islam and Hinduism through the 18th-century.

During the colonial era, Christian missionaries aiming to convert Hindus to Christianity wrote memoirs and books that were widely distributed in Europe, which Mitter, Pennington and other scholars call as fictionalised stereotypes, where murti were claimed as the evidence of lack of spiritual heritage in primitive Hindus, of "idolatry and savage worship of stones" practices akin to Biblical demons, calling Murti as monstrous devils to eroticised bizarre beings carved in stone. The British Missionary Society with colonial government's assistance bought and sometimes seized, then transferred murti from India and displayed it in their "trophies" room in the United Kingdom with the note claiming that these were given up by Hindus who now accept the "folly and sin of idolatry". In other instances, the colonial British authorities, seeking additional government revenue, introduced Pilgrim Tax on Hindus to view murti inside major temples.

The missionaries and orientalist scholars attempted to justify the need for colonial rule of India by attacking murti as a symbol of depravity and primitiveness, arguing that it was, states Tanisha Ramachandran, "the White Man's Burden to create a moral society" in India. This literature by the Christian missionaries constructed the foundation of a "Hindu image" in Europe, during the colonial era, and it blamed murti idolatry as "the cause for the ills of Indian society". By 19th-century, ideas such as pantheism (universe is identical with God or Brahman), contained in newly translated Sanskrit texts were linked to idolatry of murti and declared as additional evidence of superstitions and evil by Christian missionaries and colonial authorities in British India.

The polemics of Christian missionaries in colonial India triggered a debate among Hindus, yielding divergent responses. It ranged from activists such as Rammohun Roy who denounced all murti, to Vivekananda who refused to denounce murti and asked Hindus in India and Christians in the West to introspect, that images are used everywhere to help think and as a road to ideas, in the following words,

Religious intolerance and polemics, state Halbertal and Margalit, have historically targeted idols and material symbols cherished by other religions, while encouraging the worship of material symbols of one's own religion, characterising the material symbols of others as grotesque and wrong, in some cases dehumanising the others and encouraging the destruction of idols of the others. The outsider conflates and stereotypes the "strange worship" of the other religions as "false worship" first, then calls "false worship" as "improper worship and false belief" of pagan or an equivalent term, thereafter constructing an identity of the others as "primitive and barbarians" that need to be saved, followed by justified intolerance and often violence against those who cherish a different material symbol than one's own. In the history of Hinduism and India, states Pennington, Hindu deity images (murti) have been a religious lens for focusing this anti-Hindu polemic and was the basis for distortions, accusations and attacks by non-Indian religious powers and missionaries.

Significance

Ancient Indian texts assert the significance of murti in spiritual terms. The Vāstusūtra Upaniṣad, whose palm-leaf manuscripts were discovered in the 1970s among remote villages of Orissa – four in Oriya language and one in crude Sanskrit, asserts that the doctrine of murti art making is founded on the principles of origin and evolution of universe, is a "form of every form of cosmic creator" that empirically exists in nature, and it functions to inspire a devotee towards contemplating the Ultimate Supreme Principle (Brahman). This text, whose composition date is unknown but probably from late 1st millennium CE, discusses the significance of images as, state Alice Boner and others, "inspiring, elevating and purifying influence" on the viewer and "means of communicating a vision of supreme truth and for giving a taste of the infinite that lies beyond". It adds (abridged):

In the fifth chapter of Vāstusūtra Upaniṣad, Pippalada asserts, "from tattva-rupa (essence of a form, underlying principle) come the pratirupani (images)". In the sixth chapter, Pippalada repeats his message that the artist portrays the particular and universal concepts, with the statement "the work of the Sthapaka is a creation similar to that of the Prajapati" (that which created the universe). Non-theistic Jaina scholars such as Jnansundar, states John Cort, have argued the significance of murti along the same lines, asserting that "no matter what the field – scientific, commercial, religious – there can be no knowledge without an icon", images are part of how human beings learn and focus their thoughts, icons are necessary and inseparable from spiritual endeavours in Jainism.

While murti are an easily and commonly visible aspect of Hinduism, they are not necessary to Hindu worship. Among Hindus, states Gopinath Rao, one who has realised Self (Soul, Atman) and the Universal Principle (Brahman, god) within himself, there is no need for any temple or divine image for worship. Those who have yet to reach this height of realisation, various symbolic manifestations through images, idols and icons as well as mental modes of worship are offered as one of the spiritual paths in the Hindu way of life. This belief is repeated in ancient Hindu scriptures. For example, the Jabaladarshana Upanishad states:

See also 

Hindu iconography
Hindu deities
Ishta-Deva
Thangka
Utsava

References

Further reading 
 "Idolatry and The Colonial Idea of India: Visions of Horror, Allegories of Enlightenment" by Swagato Ganguly. Routledge.
Prasanna K Acharya, Indian Architecture According to Manasara-Silpasastra, South Asia Books, 
Prasanna K Acarya (1927), A dictionary of Hindu architecture : treating of Sanskrit architectural terms, with illustrative quotations from silpāśāstras, general literature, and archaeological records, Oxford University Press (Out of Print), 
Alice Boner (1965), Principles of composition in Hindu sculpture, BRILL, 
TA Gopinatha Rao (1993), Elements of Hindu iconography, Vol 1 and 2, Motilal Banarsidass, 
Vidya Dehejia (1997), Indian Art, Phaidon, 
P Mitter (2001), Indian Art, Oxford University Press, 
Vinayak Bharne and Krupali Krusche (2012), Rediscovering the Hindu Temple, Cambridge Scholars Publishing,

External links 

Divine Images in Stone and Bronze: South India, Chola Dynasty (c. 850–1280), Aschwin Lippe, Metropolitan Museum Journal, Vol. 4, pages 29–79
The Sculpture of Greater India, Aschwin Lippe, The Metropolitan Museum of Art Bulletin, New Series, Vol. 18, No. 6, pages 177–192
The Arts of South and Southeast Asia, Steven Kossak, The Metropolitan Museum of Art Bulletin, New Series, Vol. 51, No. 4

Objects used in Hindu worship
Hindu iconography
Puja (Hinduism)
Cult images